"Wasteland" is a single released by alternative metal band 10 Years in 2005. It is their debut single from their first major release, The Autumn Effect. The song reached number one on the Billboard Alternative Songs chart in February 2006 during its twenty-seventh week on the chart, making it one of the slowest-rising number-one singles in the chart's history. It also spent an unprecedented ten weeks at the number two position on the Billboard Mainstream Rock Tracks chart. In December 2017, the RIAA gave "Wasteland" a gold certification for selling 500,000 copies.

The song was originally featured on the band's independent second album Killing All That Holds You, produced by Travis Wyrick. The album was eventually reissued with four acoustic tracks. The acoustic tracks were recorded live by Mike D for Lakeside Studios.

Music videos 

The first music video was a representation of the song and featured Jesse Hasek's cousin actor, Brad Renfro, who, having had a long struggle with drug abuse, was the inspiration for the song. It was directed by Scott Lee. This music video has been removed from many websites including YouTube.

A second music video was a metaphorical representation using a fish flopping around on a dry lake bed. Directed by Chris Simms, this version can only be seen online.

The third and final music video released for the song addressed the social problem of human rights around the world, showing various victims of human rights violations. This video was directed by Kevin Kerslake for Amnesty International. The video received nominations for Best Direction and Best Art Direction at the 2006 MTV Video Music Awards.

In Brazil, this song was featured in a promotional video for the TV series Heroes.

The first and second music videos used the recording of the song from the album Killing All That Holds You, while the final video used the re-recorded version from The Autumn Effect.

Track listing

Charts

Certifications

References

2005 debut singles
10 Years (band) songs
Universal Records singles
2005 songs
Songs written by Jesse Hasek
Song recordings produced by Josh Abraham